Su Meng  (born 1988) is a classical guitarist. She was born in Qingdao, Shandong. She started studying classical guitar in 1997 under the tuition of Chen Zhi of the Central Conservatory of Music. In 2006 she was under full scholarship of Manuel Barrueco of the Peabody Institute of The Johns Hopkins University. She has also performed in a quartet formation with Wang Yameng, Li Jie, and Chen Shanshan (Four Angels). Currently she is concertizing as a soloist and also in duo with Wang Yameng, as the Beijing Guitar Duo.

Competitions 
2002: first prize in the 5th Vienna International Guitar Competition.  
2005: first prize in the 48th Tokyo International Guitar Competition. 
2006: winner of the first Parkening Young Guitarist Competition. 
2006: winner of the first Iserlohn Guitarist Competition.
2014: Maryland State Art Council's Individual Artist Award in Classical Solo Performance 
2015: winner of the fourth Parkening Guitar Competition.

Discography
Guitar Concert in Korea by Four Angels Quartet, 2006 (Alma Guitar)
Maracaípe Beijing Guitar Duo (Meng Su & Yameng Wang) (2009), (2010 Latin Grammy Nomination for "Maracaípe" by Sergio Assad)
Bach to Tan Dun Beijing Guitar Duo (Meng Su & Yameng Wang) (2011)
CHINA-WEST Manuel Barrueco & Beijing Guitar Duo (Meng Su & Yameng Wang)(2014)

Video
 (Guitar Concert in Korea - Live) 2005 (Alma Guitar)
Guitar Concert in Korea by
Four Angels Quartet, 2006 (Alma Guitar)

References
“她的水平已经不需要我给与什么指导了” — David Russell—Classical guitarist 
"Ms. Su’s captivating performance of Sergio Assad’s Aquarelle brought out the underlying Samba rhythms in magical fashion"  — ClevelandClassical.com
"having the star potential to serve as inspiration for new generations of guitarists to come.” — Classical Guitar Magazine
"a meditative and improvisational interpretation full of exquisite rubato and colorful effects...that took my breath away” —SF ClassicalVoice 
"The Beijing Duo’s performance was a model of elegant clarity,sumptuously beautiful tone production, and emotional contrast."  —SF Classical Voice
“我从未想到把钢琴独奏改编成吉他二重奏，竟如此的好听：这张《巴赫到谭盾》的CD碟，记录了我机欣赏的（北京吉他二重奏）的经典。"  —Tan Dun— Musician Conductor

External links

Maryland Honors 89 Artists for Excellence Mar 26, 2014

Homepages
 
 Beijing Guitar Duo  Meng Su & Yameng Wang

Biographical

 Beijing Guitar Duo
Biography Peabody Institute
Biography and Photo (from www.almaguitar.com)
Info

Other
Jonathan Palevsky interviews the Beijing Guitar Duo (Meng Su & Yameng Wang) and their mentor Manuel Barrueco (March 20, 2010) ref
Performance: Paganini - Caprice no 24 ref

1988 births
Living people
Chinese classical guitarists
Musicians from Qingdao
People's Republic of China musicians
Women classical guitarists
21st-century guitarists
21st-century women guitarists